Nagia runa is a species of moth in the family Erebidae. It is found on Borneo and in Singapore and Peninsular Malaysia. The habitat consists of lowland areas.

References

Nagia
Moths described in 1902
Moths of Asia